In both science fiction and utopia/dystopian fiction, authors have made frequent use of the age-old idea of a global state and, accordingly, of world government.

Overview
In tune with Immanuel Kant's vision of a world state based on the voluntary political union of all countries of this planet in order to avoid colonialism and in particular any future war ("Idee zu einer allgemeinen Geschichte in weltbürgerlicher Absicht", 1784; "Zum ewigen Frieden", 1795), some of these scenarios depict an egalitarian and utopian world supervised (rather than controlled) by a benevolent (and usually democratic) world government. Others, however, describe the effects of a totalitarian regime which, after having seized power in one country, annexes the rest of the world in order to dominate and oppress all mankind.

One major influence was Edward Bellamy's Looking Backward.  The best-known advocate of world government was H. G. Wells.  He describes such a system in The Shape of Things to Come, Men Like Gods and The World Set Free.

Some writers have also parodied the idea: E. M. Forster's The Machine Stops (1909) and Aldous Huxley's 1932 novel Brave New World.  Wells himself wrote The Sleeper Awakes, an early vision of a dystopian world.

World government themes in science fiction are particularly prominent in the years following World War II, coincident with the involvement of many scientists in the actual political movement for world government in response to the perceived dangers of nuclear holocaust.  Prominent examples from the Cold War era include Childhood's End (1953), Starship Troopers (1959), Star Trek (from 1966), the Doctor Who story The Enemy of the World (1968) and Captain Scarlet and the Mysterons (1968) Later references to a unified world government also appear however in post-Cold War science fiction television series such as Babylon 5.

The concept also appears frequently in science fiction anime, whether in the form of a strengthened United Nations or an entirely new organizations with world presidential election. Examples of anime with this premise are Macross (adapted in America as the first part of Robotech) and Gundam.

President of Earth

President of Earth (also known as President of the World) is a fictional concept or character who is the leader of Planet Earth. Examples include the following:

 In DC Comics, superhero Bart Allen had a presidential grandfather President Thawne;  Jacques Foccart, the second Invisible Kid, went on to serve as President of Earth.
 A poem titled "The President of Earth" by author David Kennedy (born 1959), in a book with the same title.
 A fictional character in a fictional universe in The Adventures of Captain Proton holoprogram on USS Voyager's holodeck
 Gerry Anderson's 1960s supermarionation puppet shows, via their TV Century 21 comic and episodes of Captain Scarlet and the Mysterons, featured a World President as head of a unified World Government.
 In the 1968 film Barbarella, Barbarella is sent out by the President of Earth.
 In The New Twilight Zone episode "Lost and Found" and the Phyllis Eisenstein 1978 short story of the same title upon which it was based, a woman named Jenny Templeton (Akosua Busia) will someday be elected the first president of Earth, presumably in the 21st century and will eventually be called "The Great Peacemaker".
 In Babylon 5: In the Beginning, the president of Earth orders all available ships to form a line around the planet in a vain attempt to stave off the final Minbari obliteration of the human race. This, the Battle of the Line, is the final battle of the war.
 In Futurama (which is set in the 31st century), the position of President of Earth is held by Richard Nixon's Head, preceded by "Earth President McNeal".
 In Doctor Who, several future timelines – most notably the 26th century's Earth Empire – have a President of Earth. In the first such story, Frontier in Space, the President's world government is specifically based on the United States government. The Doctor is assigned President of Earth by the United Nations, with full control over the planet's armies, in the episode "Death in Heaven" – a role he resumes in "The Zygon Invasion" / "The Zygon Inversion" and later "The Pyramid at the End of the World".
 In Space Battleship Yamato 2202, Earth is governed by the Earth Federation under the rule of a President, who is seen in Episode 2.
In fiction the 2019 novel. The First President of Earth,  Bill Buchanan becomes the first president of earth. 
In the season finale of the second season of The Epic Tales of Captain Underpants, George and Harold write a comic where Earth is ruled by a President. However, they learn from the superintendent that Erica Wang (one of their classmates) beating a recent obstacle course will help her become President of Earth in the future. The superintendent is actually Erica from the future.
In the 2015 video game Citizens of Earth, players play as the newly elected Vice President of Earth.

World governmental organizations in fiction and popular culture

Democracy
 Indian science fiction show of the 90s Captain Vyom showed a world government with the capital at New Delhi.
 Global Defense Initiative (a powerful military branch of the UN) in the Command & Conquer series of video games.
 The Confederation in Peter F Hamilton's Night's Dawn Trilogy (or more specifically GovCentral and most planetary governments, some even stretch across multiple systems).
 The Unified Earth Government (the root of the United Nations Space Command) in the Halo series is an interplanetary government.
 The United Earth Federation in the video game Supreme Commander is a Martial Government that rules all of Earth and several other planets in the galaxy.
 The Government of Earth is the fictional world government in the animated science-fiction comedy series Futurama. It is also supported by D.O.O.P. (an interplanetary equivalent to the United Nations).
 United Earth, also known as the New United Nations, was the governing body of Earth in the Star Trek franchise. It was formed after Earth made first contact with Vulcans and was later a political subdivision of the United Federation of Planets. Membership status within the United Federation of Planets were granted to planetary nation-states on the condition that the civilization independently developed faster-than-light capabilities and achieved planetary unification.
 The Earth Alliance in Babylon 5 was founded in 2085 as a democracy, and conquered most nations who refused to join by 2150.
 The Earth Federation in the Gundam anime series, formed as a response to widespread famine, disease and war. It forced most of the earth population into space colonies.
 The Terran Confederation in the Wing Commander universe, is a federal republic formed in 2416.
 The Terran Federation in Robert A. Heinlein's Starship Troopers, formed by a group of veterans after the collapse of national governments around the world. Only those who have served in the military are allowed to vote and hold political office.
 In The Forever War by Joe Haldeman, the United Nations is a world government, who carefully controls food resources and officially endorses homosexuality to control overpopulation.
 In Gerry Anderson's Supermarionation TV franchise, in which series such as Fireball XL5, Stingray, Thunderbirds, Captain Scarlet and the Mysterons, Joe 90 and The Secret Service, would feature the World Army, the World Navy and the World Air Force. There was also the World Aquanaut Security Patrol (The W.A.S.P'S), the World Space Patrol (W.S.P), World Intelligence Network (W.I.N) and Universal Secret Service (U.S.S).  All run by a World Government (overseen by a world President) located in the world capital Futura City.
 In his scurrilous novel New Shoes, RD Le Coeur has the president of earth as Bernado Bohemoth Beelzebub who the alien visitors come seeking on Earth. .
 In Orson Scott Card's "Shadow of the Giant", Peter Wiggin becomes Hegemon over the Earth.
 "Mobile Suit Gundam Wing" is set in a world run by the Alliance.
 In Martian Successor Nadesico, Earth and several lunar and Martian colonies are governed by United Earth, with a united military force called the "United Earth Allied Forces".
 In Planetes, a Japanese anime, "INTO" International Treaty Organization is a type of world government.
 In the manga Eden: It's an Endless World! A supranational organization "Propater" which grew within NATO and the UN, and eventually took them over. Propater controls much of the world, including Japan, the US, much of Europe and South America. Later this organization became " United World The Federation of Earth".
 In Appleseed (manga), after World War III the planet is supervised by a utopian city called Olympus. The Central Management Bureau, more commonly referred to as Aegis in the manga, is the political organization that runs the city-state of Olympus. Aegis is looking after the whole planet, other than total disarmament and the supervision of trade and economy, every country is pretty much free to do as they please.
 In video game Deus Ex: Invisible War takes place in 2072, twenty years after the original, in a world being rebuilt after the destruction of global infrastructure at the hands of the first game's protagonist, JC Denton. The World Trade Organization somehow forms a global government, creating modern city-states, known as enclaves, in which the majority of the game takes place.
 In Aldnoah.Zero, Earth is united under one government, with a united military force known as the United Forces of Earth (UFE).
 In Space: Above and Beyond, Earth and its colonies are under the rule of the Secretary-General of the United Nations.
 In Neon Genesis Evangelion, the United Nations commands a military made up of the former Earth countries' militaries.
 In the Expanse universe, the UN governs Earth and its immediate colonies (most notably Luna).
 Killzone (series) – The UCN (United Colonial Nations) in the Killzone series essentially act as the United Nations. It presides over all the Earth-held colonies in space with Earth itself as its capital. Also, the ISA (Interplanetary Strategic Alliance), the main protagonists of Killzone, act as the UCN's "NATO" forces. Every UCN colony is allowed to have its own ISA military to defend itself in times of war, but they are all under (indirect) control of the UCN.
 Dead Space (series) – The Earth Government Colonial Alliance, known also as Earth Government and EarthGov, is the executive branch of Earth and its colonies, responsible for administrating the territories that officially fall under its control.
 Red City – Is a series from Image Comics. The entire solar system has been united under one central government, and each planet acts like a state. They call it NSS (New Solar System).
 Pacific Rim (film) – The United Nations were called upon to rally together following the 2013 and 2014 Kaiju attacks in San Francisco, Manila, Cabo and Sydney. When Jasper Schoenfeld presented the idea for the "Jaeger" in Seoul, South Korea's World Conference, September 15, 2014, the UN chose to set aside old rivalries for "the greater good" and collaborate to make the Jaeger Program possible. The "Pan Pacific Defense Corps" was established in late 2014. The United Nations served as the PPDC's primary benefactors and were involved in the approval of Jaeger manufacturing connected to the PPDC's higher ups.
 Independence Day: Resurgence – Since the attack in the first film, it appears that the UN has become the governing body and defense force of mankind.
 Call of Duty: Infinite Warfare – The United Nations Space Alliance (UNSA) is an international political organization that handles matters related to trade, travel, land claims and all efforts relating to human space colonization. Their military force is represented by the Solar Associated Treaty Organization (SATO).
 Armitage III – The Earth Federation makes a treaty with Mars and creates One Nation for both societies.
 Xenosaga – The Galaxy Federation, also simply known as the Federation and sometimes The Fed, is the body that governs nearly 500,000 planets throughout the known universe, and essentially rules and governs humanity in the T.C. era in Xenosaga.
 Zone of the Enders – The United Nations Space Force (commonly abbreviated UNSF) is Earth's primary military force. It is present in all Zone of the Enders media to date, and is composed of several different divisions with their own duties and jurisdictions. The UNSF is the military force maintained by Earth to protect their interests in the colonies, as well as acting a defense force for the colonies.
 Altered Carbon (TV series) - The United Nations Interstellar Protectorate, also referred to simply as the Protectorate or the United Nations, is a sovereign interstellar colonial empire that spreads across a hundred-light-year bubble of human-inhabited space outwards from Sol. The unified human state is the direct successor of the intergovernmental organization founded in 1945, after World War II, which gradually evolved its mandate, stripping national governments of their prominence on the world (and later interstellar) stage to the point where it held sovereignty over all of humanity.
 The Wandering Earth - In the future, the Sun has aged and is about to turn into a red giant, pushing the nations of the world to consolidate into the United Earth Government, a world government, to initiate a project to move the Earth out of the Solar System to the Alpha Centauri system, in order to preserve further human civilization.
In the grand strategy science fiction game Stellaris, one of the fates of the human race is to become the United Nations of Earth, a unified planetary state most likely the successor to the UN of modern times.

Authoritarian
 The Imperium of Man in Warhammer 40000 is a large sprawling empire spanning over a million planets.
 The totalitarian Terran Federation from the British science fiction television programme Blake's 7.
 World Government in the Japanese manga and anime series One Piece.
 The Alliance in the Firefly universe is a result of a Chinese and American alliance.

Multiple types
 The novels and short stories of science fiction author Isaac Asimov frequently depict the existence of some variety of world government. The first such mention appears to be his short story 'Evidence', published in 1946; the story mentions that governments have formed four regions. In the next story, 'The Evitable Conflict', they have formed a Federation, created in 2044 CE, with an elected World Coordinator. His headquarters are in New York City. Regional capitals also exist. Later stories show how this union leads to planetary unions and eventually to the Galactic Empire.
 The United Earth Directorate from the StarCraft series is a government controlling Earth. Meanwhile, the Terran Confederacy and later the Terran Dominion control a number of the other planets that humans inhabit.
 The CoDominium, from the CoDominium series by Jerry Pournelle is a union of the United States and the USSR which serves as world government.
 Future timelines of Doctor Who repeatedly show a world government with space colonisation, usually under the name Earth Empire/Human Empire.

Corporatocracy
 The Buy-n-Large Corporation is a world government in the film WALL-E. CEO Shelby Forthright (portrayed in live-action by Fred Willard) as leader of the world government proposed the plans to evacuate, clean up and recolonize the planet. However, he gave up hope after realizing he underestimated just how toxic the planet had become.

Artificial Intelligence
 The Thunderhead is a benevolent and all powerful artificial intelligence (Al) in the Arc of a Scythe book series by Neal Shusterman. The Thunderhead takes the place of all world governments in the year 2042 as a conscious version of today's internet. All of its decisions are in the best interest of humanity, and it makes no mistakes, however a human-run organization known as the "Scythedom" is deeply corrupt and threatens to ruin the peace created by the Thunderhead.

Unknown
 In Eoin Colfer's The Supernaturalist, it is stated that all international boundaries were erased in a "one world" act.

See also
 World government
 United Nations in popular culture

References

Science fiction
Science fiction themes
Books about globalization
Utopian fiction
Dystopian fiction
Fiction about Earth